The Saint-Brieuc Challenger (currently known as Open Harmonie mutuelle for sponsorship reasons) is a professional tennis tournament played on indoor hard courts. It is currently part of the ATP Challenger Tour. It is held annually in Saint-Brieuc, France, since 2004.

Past finals

Singles

Doubles

External links
Official website
ITF Search

ATP Challenger Tour
Clay court tennis tournaments
Tennis tournaments in France
 
Recurring sporting events established in 2004